Shady Records is an American record label founded by rapper Eminem and his manager Paul Rosenberg, after the highly successful release of Eminem's The Slim Shady LP in 1999.

Shady has seen positive times when being part of the successful worldwide Anger Management tours and, in 2006, released an album showcasing its roster on Eminem Presents: The Re-Up. It was also Shady Records that put together the soundtrack to the Eminem-starring film 8 Mile, which had the lead single "Lose Yourself". The song went on to become the first ever hip hop song to receive an Academy Award for Best Original Song.

Current acts include Eminem, Bad Meets Evil, Westside Boogie and Grip, while former acts include D12, Obie Trice, 50 Cent, Stat Quo, Bobby Creekwater, Cashis, Slaughterhouse, Yelawolf, Griselda, Westside Gunn and Conway the Machine.

History

1999–2004: Formation, growth and feuds

After Eminem released The Slim Shady LP, he started his own record label in late 1999. Eminem looked for an avenue to release D12, and Rosenberg was keen to start a label, which led to the 2 teaming up to form Shady. Its A&R Marc Labelle has defined the record label as "a boutique label but [with] all the outlets of a major [and] Interscope backing up our every move."

D12 was the first act signed by Shady as they had been rapping together since the 1990s, and the members had made a promise that whoever became successful would come back and sign the others. In June 2001, D12 released Devil's Night, peaking at #1 on the Billboard 200. Obie Trice was introduced to Eminem through D12's Bizarre. Eminem signed him in June 2001 as the second Shady act. Obie Trice first got public attention via a freestyle skit on the Devil's Night album.

While working on the film 8 Mile, Eminem had a meeting with then underground rapper 50 Cent. Eminem had heard 50 Cent's early mixtapes, taken them to Dr. Dre and offered him the chance to work together on the artist. 50 Cent became the first solo artist signed to Shady and Aftermath. The 8 Mile soundtrack was the second Shady LP to be released. The first single was "Lose Yourself", which earned multiple nominations and became a surprise win of an Academy Award for Best Original Song, the first time a hip hop song had ever won the award. The second single was 50 Cent's "Wanksta", which was released as a buzz track and became popular in 50 Cent's home town. During this time, Eminem had also made a deal with DJ Green Lantern, who released the label's first mixtape, Invasion!, in 2002. He was the DJ for Eminem during the Anger Management Tour.

The third release from Shady was 50 Cent's Get Rich or Die Tryin', in February 2003. The album became the fastest selling debut in U.S. history. Next to be released from Shady was Obie Trice's debut album, Cheers, six months later. Despite being commercial successful, the LP was considered overshadowed by 50 Cent's music at the time. In 2003, Shady was involved in several controversies with the likes of the inherited Murder Inc. feud that 50 Cent and G-Unit were involved in, on-going problems with the previous co-owners of The Source magazine, namely Benzino, as well as escalating issues with rapper Royce da 5'9", who was previously a friend of Eminem and D12.

Near the end of 2003, Eminem and Dr. Dre signed a joint deal with Stat Quo. Stat Quo became the second artist to be signed to Shady and Aftermath. The following year saw the release of D12's second album, D12 World. Also, in 2004, Eminem and Rosenberg began a venture offered by Sirius Satellite Radio that saw the airing of their uncensored hip hop radio station, Shade 45. Shady DJ, DJ Green Lantern, was given his own show, whilst 50 Cent's G-Unit DJ, DJ Whoo Kid, co-hosted G-Unit Radio on Saturdays.

2005–2009: Development and Eminem Presents: The Re-Up
2005 saw the release of 50 Cent's second release, The Massacre, which set a record as the sixth fastest selling album since Nielsen SoundScan started tracking albums in 1991, with 1.14 million albums sold in four days. The album was a commercial success, and was only 32,000 records away from being the best-selling album of the year. On "Piggy Bank", a song off the album, 50 Cent insulted several artists, including Jadakiss. The feud between Jadakiss and 50 Cent indirectly led to DJ Green Lantern leaving Shady Records. A few months after the release of The Massacre, Jadakiss appeared on a street DVD, and had DJ Green Lantern on loudspeaker through his phone, without Green Lantern being aware of this. The DJ shared his thoughts on how to deal with the feud. When the DVD was released and Eminem found out about what happened, Green Lantern had to leave Shady Records and Shade 45, and his upcoming album, Armageddon, was no longer a Shady Records-related project. The Alchemist was signed on as the official tour DJ for Eminem on the 2005 Anger Management 3 Tour, replacing the recently ousted DJ Green Lantern.

In August 2005, Eminem and the XXL magazine teamed up to release a special issue titled XXL Presents Shade 45, and was designed to give maximum exposure to Shade 45 as a radio station, and at the same time give maximum exposure to the Shady Records label as a whole, as well as the radio DJ's and G-Unit Records' artists. XXL executive publisher, Jonathan Rheingold, stated that typically magazines based around particular artists were not favorable, but "since Shade 45 is a truly authentic and uncensored rap radio channel, the marriage with the XXL brand made sense," before adding that it's what would interest rap fans. 2005 also saw the signing of Bobby Creekwater to the label, making him the fifth artist and the second Atlanta-based rapper.

In early 2006, Chicago-born Orange County, California-based rapper named Cashis joined Shady Records, after he managed to get his demo heard by Eminem. Later in 2006, Obie Trice released his second album, Second Round's on Me. However, the album did not fare as well commercially as his debut, seemingly because of the state of the hip-hop industry. The album saw a change in Obie Trice's style, whose first album was considered to be a little light-hearted. Second Round's on Me was considered to be a more serious, dark album, mainly showing the grittiness of Obie Trice's life and surroundings.

In early 2006, there had been talk of Eminem having the label's roster on a mixtape with new material to be presented by DJ Whoo Kid and The Alchemist. This talk went on for several months. In the end, it was announced that Eminem was so impressed with the mixtape material that he had decided to make it an official album, called Eminem Presents the Re-Up. The album had been long anticipated, until it was released in early December 2006. The release had spawned the single "You Don't Know", which featured 50 Cent, Lloyd Banks, and the latest signee Cashis.

In May 2007, Cashis released the eight-track The County Hound EP in an attempt to have people "fiend" for his music, or garner interest in it. The album was released as a limited edition EP. September saw the release of 50 Cent's third album with the label, Curtis, which was involved in a well publicized competition with rapper Kanye West, who had his third album, Graduation set for release on the same day. In June 2008, Obie Trice departed from the label. A misunderstanding was made where it was believed he was attacking the label and Eminem on a single titled "The Giant" but they were quickly dismissed. In a statement, Paul Rosenberg stated "Shady Records has agreed to allow Obie Trice to pursue his craft in a different forum free from the constraints of the current major label model [...] Eminem will continue to support and work with Obie on many levels of his career [...] He remains a close friend and member of the Shady family." In a 2012 interview, Obie opened up on the topic, admitting having issues with Interscope Records chairman Jimmy Iovine, which was Trice's fault, clarifying "I was kind of reckless, not on time, certain things and [Iovine] didn't want to further the project with me so we tried to work it out but it just didn’t come to a head so I had to do what I had to do," before going on to note that his relationship with the label is great, and he continues to work with Eminem, notably on Bottoms Up, which was to be released originally on Shady Records.

Stat Quo was also released from the label in 2008. Stat felt the root cause appeared to him to be a straining relationship with Eminem stemming from differences relating to the promotion of the album. HipHopDX detailed the events following this point in the situation leading to his release from the label with "Eminem's decision to remove himself from Stat's project, a subsequent, and unexplained, decision made by Dr. Dre to not appear in Stat's video for "Here We Go," and the aforementioned lack of support for the single by parent label, Interscope, Stat began seeking his release from the label." 2009 saw the departure of Bobby Creekwater who had been working on his debut album, A Brilliant Mistake.

2010–2016: Shady 2.0 and Shady XV
Slaughterhouse guest featured Eminem's seventh album Recovery on the bonus track "Session One". On January 12, 2011, Slaughterhouse and Yelawolf appeared on the cover of the XXL magazine with Eminem, then was confirmed that both acts were signed to Shady Records. On March 2, 2011, a track called "2.0 Boys" performed by Eminem, Slaughterhouse and Yelawolf surfaced.

On April 25, 2011, Eminem and Royce da 5'9" announced plans to team up for a joint EP, slated for release on June 14. The project served as a long-awaited follow-up to their 1999 collaboration "Nuttin' to Do", and featured production from Mr. Porter, Havoc of Mobb Deep, Bangladesh and more. "Royce and I started hanging out again and inevitably that led us back into the studio", said Eminem in a statement. "At first we were just seeing where it went without any real goal in mind, but the songs started to come together crazy, so here we are." Royce also talked about it, and said: "I'm excited to see this project come to fruition considering the long lapse in time between when we worked before and now. We had a blast doing it and we just hope everyone enjoys it while we're working on the 'Monster' that will be the Slaughterhouse album."

In October 2011, Yelawolf and Slaughterhouse, along with Eminem, freestyled over East Flatbush Project's "Tried by 12" on a DJ Premier-hosted BET Cypher segment at the 2011 BET Hip Hop Awards. Becoming referred to as the "Shady 2.0 BET Cypher", it was considered to be a fan favorite segment of the cipher sessions presented throughout the awards show, with talk spreading across many online social media outlets, and Twitter having popularised trends relating with the terms "#Cypher" and "#Shady 2.0" as it was airing.

The label showcased acts at the 2012 SXSW festival on March 16, 2012, at the Austin Music Hall. The evening was presented by Shade 45 radio host Sway Calloway, the Shady Records artist line up for the evening included Slaughterhouse and 50 Cent, who performed his début album Get Rich or Die Tryin' in its entirety for the first time. Yelawolf was also scheduled to perform but couldn't due to a spleen injury earlier that month.

On March 20, 50 Cent announced that his 50 Cent's fifth studio album would be released on July 2, 2012. This was later delayed to November 13, 2012. Another delay was announced, pushing the release back to January 2013. On March 29, 2012, Yelawolf announced his second release under Shady, tentatively titled Love Story. On May 24, 2012, Eminem announced his eighth studio album, The Marshall Mathers LP 2, which was then released on November 5, 2013.

When speaking about all future Shady Records releases president Paul Rosenberg said that Eminem's next album would be released post-Memorial Day 2013 and to expect new music from it soon. He also went on to discuss the other acts saying 50 Cent's Street King Immortal would be released in the first half of 2013, with Yelawolf's second album, Love Story, currently being recorded. Rosenberg would also state that all four members of Slaughterhouse would release solo projects prior to them returning to the studio as a group to record their second album under Shady Records. The first album released would be Joe Budden's No Love Lost on February 5, 2013, under E1 Music. The second would be Kxng Crooked's Apex Predator released under Treacherous C.O.B and Empire Distribution. However, Royce and Joell Ortiz of Slaughterhouse would confirm in May 2013 that they had put their solo projects on hold, and had begun working on their third studio album.

On February 20, 2014, 50 Cent announced he left Interscope Records, which included his deal with Shady Records and Aftermath Entertainment, in which he is now signed to Caroline Records.

On August 25, 2014, a press release on Eminem's official website announced an upcoming compilation album by Shady Records, titled Shady XV. The two-disc album is scheduled for release on November 24, 2014, in the week of Black Friday and will consist of one greatest hits disc and one disc of new material from Shady Records artists such as D12, Slaughterhouse, Bad Meets Evil, and Yelawolf. On the same day, August 25, 2014, the first single from the album, titled "Guts Over Fear" and featuring singer-songwriter Sia, was released.

2017–present: New signees and the disbandment of D12 and Slaughterhouse
On March 3, 2017, Shady Records and Griselda Records announced that Shady Records had signed Westside Gunn and Conway the Machine to the label both individually and collectively. Following the 2017 BET Hip-Hop Awards on October 11, 2017, Shady Records announced that they had signed Compton rapper Boogie.

On October 27, 2017, Yelawolf released his third album for Shady Records, Trial by Fire.

On December 15, 2017, Eminem released his ninth studio album, Revival.

On April 26, 2018, Royce da 5'9" announced that Slaughterhouse had officially disbanded.

On August 12, 2018, while on tour Yelawolf stated Trunk Muzik III would be his final release on Shady Records.

On August 31, 2018, Eminem released his tenth studio album Kamikaze without any prior promotion. The song "Stepping Stone" on that album announces that D12 has officially disbanded.

On January 25, 2019, Boogie released his debut album Everything's for Sale. The album was met with critical acclaim. Commercially, it debuted at number 28 on Billboard 200 selling 18,397 album-equivalent units in its first week.

Then on March 29, 2019, Yelawolf released his last album on Shady Records Trunk Muzik III. The album debuted at number 28 on the Billboard 200.

On November 29, 2019, Griselda released their first album on the label, WWCD.

On January 17, 2020, Eminem released his eleventh studio album Music to Be Murdered By without any prior announcement. Commercially, it debuted at number one in 12 countries. In the United States, the album sold 279,000 in its first week becoming Eminem's tenth consecutive number-one album in the country. Eminem became the only artist with ten consecutive number-one albums in the United States and United Kingdom.

On July 2, 2021, it was announced that Atlanta rapper Grip had signed to the label.

On August 27, 2021, Grip released his debut Shady album, I Died for This!?.

On February 25, 2022, Conway the Machine released his second studio album, God Don't Make Mistakes, and on June 17, 2022, Westside Boogie released More Black Superheroes.

On August 5, 2022, Eminem released his second greatest hits album, Curtain Call 2, following his 2005 compilation album Curtain Call: The Hits. The album debuted at no. 6 on Billboard 200.

Artists

Current acts

Former acts

Discography
The following is the list of all albums released through Shady Records and distributed by Interscope Records. Any additional record label involved are specified.

Studio albums

Compilation albums

Extended plays

References

External links
Official website
Interview with VP A&R Marc Labelle, HitQuarters Nov 2005

American record labels
American hip hop record labels
Interscope Records
Record labels established in 1999

Vanity record labels
Labels distributed by Universal Music Group
Eminem
Hardcore hip hop record labels
1999 establishments in New York (state)